The 2015 Kansas City mayoral election took place on June 23, 2015, to elect the Mayor of Kansas City, Missouri. The election will be held concurrently with various other local elections, and is officially nonpartisan.

Incumbent Mayor Sly James, an Independent in office since 2011, won re-election to a second term in office.

A primary election was held on April 7 to determine the two candidates that moved on to the general election.

Candidates
 Clay Chastain, light rail activist residing in Bedford, Virginia
 Sly James, incumbent Mayor
 Vincent Lee, real estate broker

Primary election

Results

General election

Candidates
 Sly James, incumbent Mayor
 Vincent Lee, real estate broker

Results

References

External links
Kansas City, Missouri municipal elections, 2015 - Ballotpedia
City of Kansas City Mayor's Office
SOS, Missouri - Elections: 2015 Election Calendar

2010s in Kansas City, Missouri
2015 Missouri elections
2015 United States mayoral elections
2015
Non-partisan elections